Group A of the 2018 Fed Cup Europe/Africa Zone Group II was one of two pools in the Europe/Africa zone of the 2018 Fed Cup. Three teams competed in a round robin competition, with the top two teams and the bottom team proceeding to their respective sections of the play-offs: the top two teams played for advancement to Group I, while the bottom team faced potential relegation to Group III.

Standings 

Standings are determined by: 1. number of wins; 2. if two teams have the same number of wins, head-to-head record; 3. if three teams have the same number of wins, (a) number of matches won in the group, then (b) percentage of sets won in the group, then (c) percentage of games won in the group, then (d) Fed Cup rankings.

Round-robin

Denmark vs. Egypt

Egypt vs. Greece

Denmark vs. Greece

References

External links 
 Fed Cup website

A2